Scientists at the University of Connecticut together with principals at the Connecticut Department of Energy and Environmental Protection (DEEP) have identified numerous plant species that pose a threat to habitats, human health and economy. The list below is a partial inventory of non-native species that are considered to be an existing threat or potential threat.

Terrestrial Plant Threats

See also
Invasive species in the United States

References

External links
invasivespecies.gov United States Government.

Invasive
Connecticut
Flora of Connecticut